On 1 May 2004 ten new member states joined the European Union. This article describes the party affiliations of the leaders of each member-state represented in the European Council from 1 May until the end of 2004. The list below gives the political party that each head of government, or head of state, belonged to at the national level, as well as the European political alliance to which that national party belonged. The states are listed from most to least populous. More populous states have greater influence in the council, in accordance with the system of Qualified Majority Voting.



Summary

a – Transitional QMV system with 124 total votes and a qualified majority of 88 (70.97%), in use until 1 November 2004.
b – Final EU-25 QMV system with 321 total votes and a qualified majority of 232 (72.27%).

List of leaders (1 May 2004)

 DIKO's MEP joined the Alliance of Liberals and Democrats for Europe group in the European Parliament, but the party is not formally attached to any pan-European organization.

Changes

Affiliation

Office-holder only

See also
Presidency of the Council of the European Union

External links
Council of the European Union (official website)

Lists of parties in the European Council